Ngarohi McGarvey-Black (born 20 May 1996) is a rugby union player from New Zealand.

Biography 
McGarvey-Black made his New Zealand men's sevens debut in Las Vegas in 2018. In 2020 he was named New Zealand Rugby Players Association (NZRPA) Players' Player of the Year. He was named in the New Zealand squad for the Rugby sevens at the 2020 Summer Olympics.

McGarvey-Black was part of the All Blacks Sevens squad that won a bronze medal at the 2022 Commonwealth Games in Birmingham. He later competed at the 2022 Rugby World Cup Sevens in Cape Town. He won a silver medal after his side lost to Fiji in the gold medal final.

References

External links 
 All Blacks Sevens Profile
 
 
 
 

1996 births
Living people
Medalists at the 2020 Summer Olympics
New Zealand rugby sevens players
New Zealand rugby union players
Olympic medalists in rugby sevens
Olympic rugby sevens players of New Zealand
Olympic silver medalists for New Zealand
Rugby sevens players at the 2020 Summer Olympics
Rugby union players from Rotorua
Rugby sevens players at the 2022 Commonwealth Games
Commonwealth Games bronze medallists for New Zealand
Commonwealth Games medallists in rugby sevens
Medallists at the 2022 Commonwealth Games